William Horneck (1685-1746) was a British Army engineer of German descent.

Life
The son of the German-born preacher Anthony Horneck, he learned military science under John Churchill and designed works in Britain, Newfoundland, Minorca and elsewhere. His final rank was captain and he was buried alongside his parents in Westminster Abbey: a tablet marks the spot. His son Kane William Horneck was also a military engineer.

References

Sources
http://personalia.co.uk/HORNECK-William-1685-1746-military-engineer-ALS-to-the-Board-of-Ordnance-1733

Royal Engineers officers
English people of German descent
1685 births
1746 deaths